1211 Avenue of the Americas, also known as the News Corp. Building, is an International style skyscraper on Sixth Avenue in Midtown Manhattan in New York City. Formerly called the Celanese Building, it was completed in 1973 as part of the later Rockefeller Center expansion (1960s–1970s) dubbed the "XYZ Buildings". Celanese, its primary tenant, later moved to Dallas, Texas. The building is currently own by Ivanhoé Cambridge. 

The structure has a simple slab-like shape devoid of any decoration, its prosaic façade consisting of vertical alternating limestone and glass stripes. The façade stone piers are supernumerary; there are twice as many of them as structurally necessary. The glass bands are continuous and offer no indication of floor levels. These features ably create the visual lack of scale, so the tower does not look overly bulky.

Background

The building was part of the later Rockefeller Center expansion (1960s–1970s) dubbed the XYZ Buildings. Their plans were first drawn in 1963 by the Rockefeller family's architect, Wallace Harrison, of the architectural firm Harrison & Abramovitz. Their letters correspond to their height. 1251 Avenue of the Americas is the "X" Building as it is the tallest at 750 ft (229 m) and 54 stories, and was the first completed, in 1971. The "Y" is 1221 Avenue of the Americas, which was the second tower completed (1973) and is the second in height (674 ft and 51 stories). The "Z" Building, the shortest and the youngest, is 1211 Avenue of the Americas with 45 stories (592 ft).

The structure is LEED-certified at a silver level designation by USGBC.

Notable tenants
The building served as the global headquarters for the original News Corporation, founded by Australian-born businessman Rupert Murdoch in 1980. It continues to serve as the headquarters for subsequent spin-offs Fox Corporation (2019–present) and the present-day News Corp (2013–present), and until 2019, 21st Century Fox (2013–2019). The building is well-known for housing the main Fox News studios, part of the Fox News Group which is currently owned by Fox Corp.  News Corp divisions housed located in the building include Dow Jones & Company, The Wall Street Journal, and the New York Post.

Other companies unaffiliated with News Corp that lease office space in the building include Annaly Capital Management and Ropes & Gray LLP.

Studios 
B - After the Bell, Fox Business Tonight, Making Money, and Varney & Co.
D - Gutfeld!
E - Bulls & Bears, Countdown to the Closing Bell, First Things First, Fox Report, and Journal Editorial Report
G - Cavuto Live, Mornings with Maria, and Your World with Neil Cavuto
J - America's Newsroom, America Reports, Fox & Friends First, Justice with Judge Jeanine, Sunday Morning Futures with Maria Bartiromo, and Hannity
M - The Five, Fox & Friends, Outnumbered, Watters' World, and The Story with Martha MacCallum
N - The Evening Edit
W - Fox Weather

See also 
 1221 Avenue of the Americas
 1251 Avenue of the Americas

References 

Fox Corporation
International style architecture in New York City
Ivanhoé Cambridge
Leadership in Energy and Environmental Design basic silver certified buildings
Mass media company headquarters in the United States
News Corporation
Office buildings completed in 1973
Rockefeller Center
Sixth Avenue
Skyscraper office buildings in Manhattan